Georg Holzherr (January 22, 1927 – February 26, 2012) was the Catholic abbot of Einsiedeln Abbey, Switzerland.

Holzherr became a member of the Order of Saint Benedict in 1949 and was ordained a priest in 1953. In 1969, Holzherr became abbot of the Einsiedlen Abbey retiring in 2001.

Notes

1927 births
2012 deaths
Abbots of Einsiedeln
Swiss Benedictines
Benedictine abbots